Fan Xiaojun (born 1956) is a general of the Chinese People's Liberation Army Air Force (PLAAF). He had been Political Commissar of the Northern Theater Command since April 2017, and formerly served as Director of the Political Department of the PLAAF.

Biography
Fan Xiaojun was born in 1956 in Danyang, Jiangsu. He spent his early career in the Chengdu Military Region and the PLA General Political Department before transferring to the PLAAF.

From 2005, Fan served in the Political Department of the Beijing Military Region Air Force and the Guangzhou Military Region Air Force. In 2009, he became Political Commissar of the PLAAF's 15th Airborne Corps, China's only corps-level airborne force.

In the summer of 2014, he succeeded Lt. Gen. Yu Zhongfu as Political Commissar of the Jinan Military Region Air Force, and concurrently Deputy Political Commissar of the Jinan MR. A year later, he replaced Lt. Gen.  as Director of the Political Department of the PLAAF, and was promoted to the rank of lieutenant general. In April 2017, he was appointed Political Commissar of the Northern Theater Command, succeeding Gen. Chu Yimin to become the first military-region level political commander from the Air Force.

In October 2017, he was elected as a member of the 19th Central Committee of the Communist Party of China.

References

1956 births
Living people
People from Danyang
People's Liberation Army generals from Jiangsu
People's Liberation Army Air Force generals
Members of the 19th Central Committee of the Chinese Communist Party